Manns Beach is a small community based near Port Albert, Victoria, Australia. It contains lavatory facilities, jetty and boat ramp that provides boating access to the water body. The waterbody mouths into offshore waters of Bass Strait. At the 2006 census, Manns Beach had a population of 135.

Notes and references

Beaches of Victoria (Australia)
Towns in Victoria (Australia)
Shire of Wellington